Euschistus crenator is a species of stink bug in the family Pentatomidae. It is found in the Caribbean Sea, Central America, North America, and South America.

Subspecies
These two subspecies belong to the species Euschistus crenator:
 Euschistus crenator crenator (Fabricius, 1794)
 Euschistus crenator orbiculator Rolston, 1974

References

Articles created by Qbugbot
Insects described in 1794
Pentatomini